Philippe-Jean Bunau-Varilla (26 July 1859 – 18 May 1940) was a French engineer and soldier.  With the assistance of American lobbyist and lawyer William Nelson Cromwell, Bunau-Varilla greatly influenced Washington's decision concerning the construction site for the Panama Canal.  He also worked closely with President Theodore Roosevelt in the latter's orchestration of the Panamanian Revolution.

Early life
Bunau-Varilla was born on 26 July 1859 in Paris, France. After graduating at age 20 from the  École Polytechnique, he remained in France for three years. In 1882 he abandoned his career in public works at the École Nationale des Ponts et Chaussées and traveled to Panama. He arrived at the isthmus in 1884, employed with Ferdinand de Lesseps's Panama Canal Company. He became general manager of the organization.

Panama Canal

After the Panama Canal Company went bankrupt in 1888 amidst charges of fraud, Bunau-Varilla was left stranded in Panama.  He struggled to find a new way to construct the canal.  When the New Panama Canal Company sprang up back in his native France, Bunau-Varilla sailed home, having purchased a large amount of stock.  However, as de Lesseps' company had before, the New Panama Canal Company soon abandoned efforts to build the canal.  It sold the land in Panama to the United States, in hopes that the company would not fail entirely.  U.S. President Grover Cleveland, an anti-imperialist, avoided the canal issue.  When the more supportive Theodore Roosevelt became president in 1901, canal planning resumed in the United States.  Bunau-Varilla energetically promoted a canal in Panama.  With aid from the New Panama Canal Company's New York attorney, William Nelson Cromwell, he persuaded the government to select Panama as the canal site, as opposed to the popular alternative, Nicaragua.  When opponents voiced their interest in constructing a canal through Nicaragua, which was a less politically volatile nation, Bunau-Varilla actively lobbied in the United States, for example by distributing Nicaraguan postage stamps featuring belching volcanos to senators.  Through lobbying of businessmen, government officials, and the American public, Bunau-Varilla convinced the U.S. Congress to appropriate $40 million to the New Panama Canal Company, under the Spooner Act of 1902.  The funds were contingent on negotiating a treaty with Colombia to provide land for the canal in its territory of Panama.

Separation of Panama from Colombia

Colombia signed the Hay–Herrán Treaty in 1903, ceding land in Panama to the United States for the canal, but the Senate of Colombia rejected ratification.  Bunau-Varilla's company was in danger of losing the $40 million of the Spooner Act, and so he drew up plans with Panamanian juntas in New York for war.  By the eve of the war, Bunau-Varilla had already drafted the new nation's constitution, flag, and military establishment, and promised to float the entire government on his own checkbook.  Bunau-Varilla's flag design was later rejected by the Panamanian revolutionary council on the grounds that it was designed by a foreigner.  Although he prepared for a small-scale civil war, the violence was limited. As promised, President Roosevelt interposed a U.S. naval fleet between the Colombian forces south of the isthmus and Panamanian separatists.

U.S. control of the canal area

Bunau-Varilla, as Panama's ambassador to the United States, was invested with plenipotentiary powers by President Manuel Amador.  Lacking formal consent of the government of Panama, he entered into negotiations with the American Secretary of State, John Hay, to give control of the Panama Canal area to the U.S.  No Panamanians signed the resulting Hay–Bunau-Varilla Treaty, though it was ratified in Panama on 2 December 1903.  Bunau-Varilla had received his ambassadorship through financial assistance to the rebels, he had not lived in Panama for seventeen years, and he never returned, leading to the charge that he was "appointed Minister by cable".  Panamanians long resented the trust given to him by the new Panamanian authorities.  The treaty was finally undone by the Torrijos–Carter Treaties in 1977.

Return to Paris 
Bunau-Varilla remained active as an engineer, a financial writer, and a leading specialist in water chlorination. In World War I, he served as an officer in the French army and lost a leg at the Battle of Verdun. As an elder lobbyist, he promoted altering the canal from a lock system to a sea-level waterway.  In 1938, France awarded him the Grand Cross of the Legion of Honor. He died in Paris on 18 May 1940.

Personal income
Bunau-Varilla lived a lavish lifestyle. Guests to his elegant Paris residence often reflected on the immaculate grandeur of the home.  He was known to entertain friends and strategic partners at some of the most pricey locations of his time.  His money was not made as an engineer during his first stay working on the first Panama Canal project (under de Lesseps).  He made his fortune during his second stay in Panama from 1886 to 1889, where he ran his own company, Artigue & Sonderegger, together with his brother Maurice, who later became the rich owner of Le Matin, a major Parisian newspaper.

See also
Panama Canal
William Nelson Cromwell

References

Further reading
 Ameringer, Charles D. "The Panama Canal Lobby of Philippe Bunau-Varilla and William Nelson Cromwell." American Historical Review, Vol. 68, No. 2, January 1963, pp. 346–363. .
 Anguizola, G. A. Philippe Bunau-Varilla: The Man Behind the Panama Canal. Chicago: Nelson-Hall, 1980. .
 Healy, David. Drive to Hegemony: The United States in the Caribbean, 1898-1917. U of Wisconsin Press, 1988.
 Loizillon, Gabriel J. The Bunau-Varilla Brothers And The Panama Canal. 2019.  excerpt
McCullough, David. The Path Between the Seas 
 Major, John. "Who Wrote the Hay-Bunau-Varilla Convention?." Diplomatic History, Vol. 8, No. 2, 1984, pp. 115–123.
 Mellander, Gustavo A., Mellander, Nelly, Charles Edward Magoon: The Panama Years. Río Piedras, Puerto Rico: Editorial Plaza Mayor. ISBN 1-56328-155-4. OCLC 42970390. (1999)
 Mellander, Gustavo A., The United States in Panamanian Politics: The Intriguing Formative Years." Danville, Ill.: Interstate Publishers. OCLC 138568. (1971)
 Sevareid, Eric. "The Man Who Invented Panama."

External links
Historical Text Archive
"Philippe Jean Bunau-Varilla Biography" at Book Rags

French civil engineers
École Polytechnique alumni
École des Ponts ParisTech alumni
Corps des ponts
1859 births
1940 deaths
French soldiers
French military personnel of World War I
Grand Croix of the Légion d'honneur
Grand Officiers of the Légion d'honneur